XHRH-FM is a radio station on 103.3 FM in Puebla, Puebla. The station is owned by Grupo ACIR and carries its Amor romantic music format.

History
XHRH received its first concession on February 12, 1976. It was owned by Roberto H. López Hernández and originally operated on 93.3 MHz.

References

External links
Amor FM Puebla Facebook

Radio stations in Puebla
Radio stations established in 1976
Grupo ACIR